The 2017 Sudan Premier League is the 46th season of top-tier football in Sudan. The season began on 24 January 2017.

Standings

Relegation Playoff 
First leg, November 28, 2017: Nidal Nhod 1-1 Al-Merreikh SC (Al-Fasher)
Second leg, November 30, 2017: Al-Merreikh SC (Al-Fasher) 1-0 Nidal Nhod
Both teams remain in their current divisions

References

Sudan Premier League seasons
football
Sudan